Olivier Durocher (November 12, 1743 – July 2, 1821) was a farmer and political figure in Lower Canada.

He was born in Lanoraie in 1743, the son of Olivier Durocher, a doctor and merchant from Angers, France, and Thérèse Juillet, descended from one of the members of Adam Dollard des Ormeaux's party at Long Sault. Durocher served as a major in the militia. He was elected to the Legislative Assembly of Lower Canada for Surrey in 1796.

He died at Saint-Antoine-sur-Richelieu in 1821.

His daughter, Eulalie Durocher, was the founder of the Sisters of the Holy Names of Jesus and Mary in Canada.

External links

Les députés au premier Parlement du Bas-Canada (1792-1796), F-J Audet (1946) - see entry for Jean-Baptiste Durocher

1743 births
1821 deaths
Members of the Legislative Assembly of Lower Canada